The Panel is a talk show produced by Happy Endings Productions for RTÉ, based on the Australian programme The Panel, produced by Working Dog Productions for Network Ten. The theme song was "Waterfall" by The Stone Roses.

Until 2006 it was hosted by Dara Ó Briain. Ó Briain, having presented Echo Island, came to popular acclaim at home through his regular appearances in Don't Feed the Gondolas, a topical comedy show in the same Monday night slot on Network 2.

Recorded at various locations around Dublin—including Belvedere College's O'Reilly Theatre, Dublin City University's Helix Theatre and Blanchardstown's Draíocht Theatre—its sudden apparent cancellation in December 2005 annoyed fans but The Panel returned with a largely unchanged format in October 2006. Until early 2008 it aired on Network 2 (later RTÉ Two), usually on a Monday night. A disastrous move to RTÉ One (with the role of presenter rotated among the likes of Ray D'Arcy, Charlie Bird, and Dáithí Ó Sé) preceded the show's demise; one last run began on 7 October 2010 and ran each Thursday at 22:15 on RTÉ One until 26 January 2011, with Craig Doyle presenting.

Format
The show had a host who chaired the discussion, along with four panellists who changed from week to week. Regular panellists included Colin Murphy, Andrew Maxwell, Neil Delamere, Mairead Farrell and Eleanor Tiernan. They discussed current events, interspersed with interviews with special guests. Panelists were typically professional comedians, and as such the show aimed for pure comedy, rather than any hybrid of discussion or analysis and topical jokes. The producers and regular performers were clear that the show was distinguished from other panel shows by the absence of games, rounds, scores or other contrivances.

Panelists

Classic panellists included:
 Ed Byrne
 Neil Delamere
 Mairead Farrell
 Andrew Maxwell
 Colin Murphy1
 Dara Ó Briain2
 Dermot Whelan

List of episodes

First series
The first series aired on Network 2 live from The Helix in Dublin City University (9:30 – 10:30 pm) each Monday between 15 September and 17 November 2003. It was repeated on Saturdays at 10:05 pm.

Second series
The second series aired on Network 2/RTÉ Two (the channel's name changed mid-series) live from Vicar Street at 10.00 pm each Monday between 13 September and 8 November 2004. It was preceded on Monday 6 September with a Best Of… from the first series.

Third series
The third series aired on RTÉ Two on Sunday evenings at 9:30 in early 2005. It was recorded in advance at The Mermaid Arts Centre in Bray and the O'Reilly Theatre in Belvedere College.

Next series

The People Decide
In which the panellists discussed the 2007 general election. A special run of shows previewing the election, presented by Colin Murphy.

Sixth series
When the show returned for the 2007–2008 season there was no longer a single presenter; Neil Delamere or Colin Murphy presented in the absence of Ó Briain. Ó Briain returned to present one episode during this series, marking what would be his final appearance on the show, having moved on to employment in the neighbouring United Kingdom. The company he co-founded, Happy Endings Productions, continued to produce the show, and he retained an advisory relationship. Neil Delamere hosted The Panel for the first time on 8 October 2007.

Move to RTÉ One
RTÉ moved  The Panel to RTÉ One in 2008, to be shown on Thursday evenings. In addition, RTÉ deployed a different presenter for each episode – these included Ray D'Arcy, Charlie Bird, Dáithí Ó Sé and Craig Doyle, the latter of whom was given the role on a more permanent basis before The Panel was brought to an end, all humour eked out of it. The first RTÉ One episode was, in what would become commonplace, criticised for being too serious; the panellists blamed this on their new setting.

In September 2008, RTÉ moved The Panel  to its flagship television channel RTÉ One. A 14-episode run was announced, to begin airing on that channel at 22.15 on 30 October with a new presenter. Several prominent Irish broadcasters were screen-tested to fill the role of presenter, but a combination of unfortunate factors meant that show returned with rotating guest hosts, rather than any one person in a permanent position. Shortly before the airdate, RTÉ changed its schedules and the series began on 6 November at 22.15 with its original timescale of 45 minutes. Ray D'Arcy was the guest presenter for the week and was followed by a string of others including Gráinne Seoige, Dáithí Ó Sé, Marty Whelan, Charlie Bird, Phill Jupitus and Pauline McLynn. Producer Seamus Cassidy told The Irish Times that ""a reasonably big name, a very big name actually"  would take over as permanent anchor in January 2009. On 23 November 2008, the Sunday Tribune reported that comedian Ardal O'Hanlon would be announced as the new permanent host. Former presenter Ó Briain indicated his awareness of the presenter in question, and was quoted as saying on a breakfast radio show that "HE is very funny" but refused to discuss the matter any further. However, in early 2009 it emerged there would be a further delay in obtaining a permanent host for "at least another couple of weeks", with Craig Doyle presenting the first show of the new year. In the event, the guest host format continued for the entire 2008–2009 series. Following a short run with David McWilliams at the helm in 2009, the show was thought to have been de-commissioned. However, at the launch of RTÉ's Autumn schedule in August 2010, Craig Doyle was announced as presenter for a new run of 14 shows.

2008–9
Jarlath Regan, Ian Coppinger, Carol Tobin, Alan Shortt and Evelyn O'Rourke made their debuts on the show as panellists in the 2008–09 season. Karl Spain also made a return in the fifth episode. Upon Ivan Yates's appearance in the sixth episode it was claimed that he was now the record holder of guest appearances on The Panel and the political bookmaker went on to guest-host an episode of the show in 2009. For the first three episodes of 2009 no female was present on The Panel for the first time; this was rectified in the fourth episode of the year with the addition of Evelyn O'Rourke.

The Panel Unwrapped
 Shown on Tuesday, 30 December 2008

2009–10
The first episode attracted an average audience share of 23 per cent. New presenter David McWilliams apologised to broadcaster Miriam O'Callaghan for comments of a sexist nature about her he had included in his latest book.

2010–11
The Panel returned on 7 October 2010 with a new host, Craig Doyle. The regulars Maxwell, Delamere, Murphy and Farrell returned, with Eleanor Tiernan, Bernard O'Shea, Dermot Whelan, Gearóid Farrelly, John Colleary, Kevin Bridges, Stephen K. Amos and Jack Whitehall appearing throughout the series. This series included the show's 100th episode.

Cancellation
On 4 June 2011, Andrew Maxwell, one of the regular panellists said on Twitter that the show had been cancelled. The following day, RTÉ posted a headline confirming that the show had been cancelled; it read: "I can confirm that 'The Panel' won't be returning to our screens this autumn. The show has enjoyed nine seasons, the first six on RTÉ Two and the three most recent on RTÉ One".

Live performances
The show was performed live to full houses in the Olympia Theatre from 11 to 13 September 2007 as part of the Bulmers Comedy Festival. These shows, following the format of the television show but with a longer running time and stronger language, were chaired by Colin Murphy and were not recorded for television.

DVD
A DVD, The Panel – The Best of..., was released in December 2008.

Mockumentary
As part of RTÉ Does Comic Relief, a telethon event that took place on 26 June 2020, in the midst of the COVID-19 Crisis, a mockumentary on the history of The Panel featured interviews from Dara Ó Briain, and panellists Ed Byrne, Neil Delamere, Mairead Farrell, Andrew Maxwell and Colin Murphy as well as guests Adam Hills and David Mitchell.

References

External links
 

2003 Irish television series debuts
2011 Irish television series endings
Irish television talk shows
RTÉ original programming
Television news program articles using incorrect naming style